Henri Disy (6 September 1913 – September 1989) was a Belgian water polo player who competed in the 1936 Summer Olympics.

He was part of the Belgian team which won the bronze medal. He played all seven matches as goalkeeper.

See also
 Belgium men's Olympic water polo team records and statistics
 List of Olympic medalists in water polo (men)
 List of men's Olympic water polo tournament goalkeepers

References
Henri Disy's obituary

External links
 

1913 births
1989 deaths
Belgian male water polo players
Water polo goalkeepers
Olympic bronze medalists for Belgium
Olympic water polo players of Belgium
Water polo players at the 1936 Summer Olympics
Olympic medalists in water polo
Medalists at the 1936 Summer Olympics
Place of birth missing